Priceless is a 2006 French comedy film directed by Pierre Salvadori, and starring Audrey Tautou and Gad Elmaleh.  According to the director, the film is inspired by the 1961 Blake Edwards film Breakfast at Tiffany's.

Plot 
Jean (Gad Elmaleh) is a waiter/barman at a luxury hotel. Irène (Audrey Tautou), is a gold digger who convinces wealthy men to fund her lavish lifestyle in exchange for companionship and sex. When Irène's elderly lover gets drunk and falls asleep on her birthday, she goes to the hotel bar, where she assumes the barman is absent and Jean is a millionaire guest. Rather than correcting her, he makes her several impressive cocktails and they then retire, tipsy, to the hotel's Imperial suite where they spend the night together. In the morning, Jean awakens to find Irène has gone.

A year later, Irène returns to the hotel with Jacques, who asks her to marry him. Irène is surprised to see Jean, and he manages to conceal his occupation from her again. Jean and Irène sleep together again, but Jacques sees them and breaks off the engagement. Irène goes to Jean, pretending she gave up Jacques to be with him, but as they lie in bed together, they are discovered by guests and staff in the Imperial suite. When Irène discovers who Jean really is, she walks out. However, Jean is now in love and follows her, finding her at the Côte d'Azur. Pursuing her, he spends all the money to his name to pay for her presence, including his savings and pension plan, until he uses his final euro for "10 more seconds" to look into her eyes.

Irène leaves him for another rich man, and Jean is left with a hotel bill he cannot pay. Luckily, Jean is picked up by a wealthy widow, Madeleine, who pays his bills in exchange for his companionship. Irène bumps into him again with another lover, Gilles. She is a little jealous, but now that they are "equals", she teaches Jean the tricks of gold-digging. Using her advice, he soon wheedles a €30,000 watch from Madeleine, after she forced him to have plastic surgery on his ear. On a shopping spree, Irène meets up with Jean and coyly offers him the euro for "10 more seconds".

Jean continues to prove himself a skillful gold digger. He and Irène steal away from their patrons every chance they can, falling in love in the process. On the morning of Irène's departure for Venice, Gilles catches Irène and Jean kissing on the hotel room balcony.

Furious, Gilles leaves Irène at the hotel with nothing but a sarong and the swimsuit she is wearing. Jean sells his watch to buy Irène a week's stay in their hotel and a gorgeous evening gown. He also gives her an invitation to a party. Madeleine is at first upset with Jean for selling his watch, but Jean calms her down by giving her a pair of earrings. He claims that he pawned the watch to buy Madeleine a gift and she is pleased.

At the party that evening, Irène sees Jacques again, but with a new young girlfriend, Agnès. While stealing a dance with Jean, Irène hatches a plan to win Jacques back again, with Jean's assistance. Jean agrees to play along and is dumped by Madeleine in the process. However, he convinces Agnès that he is a prince and seduces her away from Jacques, giving Irène a chance to steal Jacques. However, when Irène sees Jean with Agnès on the balcony, she realizes she loves Jean. She runs away from Jacques and declares her love, abandoning her pursuit of a luxurious lifestyle. The movie ends with barefoot Irène and Jean riding off to Italy on his scooter, using the euro coin for the toll fee.

Cast 
 Audrey Tautou as Irène Mercier
 Gad Elmaleh as Jean Simon
 Marie-Christine Adam as Madeleine
 Vernon Dobtcheff as Jacques
 Jacques Spiesser as Gilles
 Annelise Hesme as Agnès

Critical response
The review aggregator Rotten Tomatoes reported that 82% of critics gave the film positive reviews, based on 72 reviews. The site's consensus reads, "Priceless is a light, farcical rom-com that features sharp performances from Audrey Tautou and Gad Elmaleh.". Metacritic reported the film had an average score of 72 out of 100, based on 20 reviews, indicating "generally favorable reviews".

After its March 2008 premiere in the United States, Stephen Holden called the film an "amusing ball of fluff that refuses to judge its characters’ amoral high jinks";  he calls it a "shrewdly cast" film "winking at the vanity of wealthy voluptuaries and hustlers playing games of tainted love."  According to Holden, the film is "too frivolous even to be called satire."  According to Mick LaSalle, what makes the film "fun" is "the harshness wrapped in a pretty package. The movie stars Audrey Tautou and Gad Elmaleh, who are about the only French stars that it's almost impossible to imagine having an active sex life. Their aura of innocence helps. Still, in America, no director could ever make this movie, even with the most innocent-seeming actors on the planet. This is way European, folks, not meant for our eyes, and, of course, that's the whole kick." LaSalle notes the following: "Priceless is an entertaining sex farce that takes its characters to some of best hotels and most exclusive restaurants in France, and to watch it is to marvel at how some people live - and how you don't. But here's the interesting thing: Through this seduction, Priceless turns the viewer into a harlot, too, who can suddenly understand why Irene would do anything and sleep with anybody just to stay in this lifestyle. Likewise, we understand—instinctively, without thinking about it or judging it—why Jean might start sleeping with an older rich woman, just so he can stay in the hotels where Irene stays. Would you want to be the person who orders the drinks or fetches the drinks? How easy would it be to go back to normal life after confirming what you never really wanted to know, that the rich really do have it better, as in a lot better, as in money really does buy happiness?  So Priceless is silly, but it's not so silly. It's pretty to look at, often very funny, but it corrupts its audience as it corrupts its characters."     In a one-star review upon the film's June 2008 release in the United Kingdom, Peter Bradshaw call the film a "gruesomely unfunny and tacky comedy-farce" and notes "the whole movie slavers over bling, and has a nasty, dated air of pseudo-worldliness and ersatz sophistication. With its luxury-tourist locations, it is basically vulgar, and not in a good way, and reminded me of the opening title sequence to the 70s TV show The Persuaders!, but without that programme's charm."

References

External links 
 
 
 

2006 films
2006 romantic comedy films
French romantic comedy films
2000s French-language films
Films shot in Monaco
Films set in France
Films set in hotels
Films directed by Pierre Salvadori
2000s French films